Stephen M. Katz may refer to:
 Steve Katz (politician), member of the New York State Assembly
 Stephen M. Katz (cinematographer), American cinematographer

See also
 Steve Katz (disambiguation)